The 2002 UAW-GM Quality 500 was a NASCAR Winston Cup Series stock car race held at Lowe's Motor Speedway on October 13. Qualifying was canceled because of rain showers, so points leader Tony Stewart started on the pole position. Jamie McMurray, subbing for an injured Sterling Marlin, won his first race in his second career start, setting a new modern era NASCAR record for quickest win. The race would also be the final race for Donlavey Racing.

Rain caused the start of the race to be delayed over 3 hours. After the rain stopped, NASCAR decided to start the race under yellow for the first 5 laps as the track continued to dry. The race began at 3:45 pm Charlotte time (Eastern). Sunset time was 6:51 pm, the race was completed at 7:17, The late finish contributed to a large jump in ratings for the NBC telecast. NASCAR decided to move the fall race at Charlotte from Sunday afternoon to Saturday night for 2003.

McMurray would go on to a modest career in NASCAR's Cup Series, with his 2010 season being the most notable, winning Daytona and Indianapolis.

Background
The race was held at Lowe's Motor Speedway in Concord, North Carolina. Lowe's Motor Speedway is a  quad-oval track that hosted two other NASCAR Winston Cup Series races during the 2002 season, the Coca-Cola Racing Family 600 and The Winston. Construction of the speedway began in 1959 and finished in 1960 before the inaugural 600-mile race. Bruton Smith and Curtis Turner were the architects of the track, which is now operated by Smith's company, Speedway Motorsports.

Race results

Failed to qualify: Carl Long (#59), Kirk Shelmerdine (#72), Scott Wimmer (#27), Jack Sprague (#60), Kerry Earnhardt (#83), Ron Hornaday Jr. (#54)

References

UAW-GM Quality 500
UAW-GM Quality 500
NASCAR races at Charlotte Motor Speedway